The  (JAA) was established in 1948 and is a nationwide organization concerned with the archaeology of Japan and the preservation of its Cultural Properties. At the time of its establishment there were 81 members and by 1998, 3,387 members, with the majority involved in cultural property management and research in government agencies.

Publications
Since 1994 the JAA has published the journal Nihon Kōkogaku (Journal of the Japanese Archaeological Association) (日本考古学).

See also
 Buried Cultural Properties
 List of National Treasures of Japan (archaeological materials)

References

External links
 Japanese Archaeological Association
 Nihon Kokogaku

Archaeology of Japan
Archaeological organizations
1948 establishments in Japan
Japanese studies